Speer is a surname.

Speer may also refer to:
Speer, Denver, a neighborhood of central Denver, Colorado
Speer, Illinois
CCI Ammunition or CCI/Speer,  a manufacturer of ammunition
Speer (mountain), in Switzerland
Speer (ship, 1939), a former passenger ship on Lake Zurich, Switzerland

See also
Spear (disambiguation)
Speer - Mattstock, a sub-range of the Appenzell Alps